Conisbrough is a town within the City of Doncaster, in South Yorkshire, England. It has a ward population (Conisbrough and Denaby) of 14,333.

Etymology
The name Conisbrough comes from the Old English  (first recorded ) meaning "king's stronghold" or "king's fortified place". Its derivation has a very similar route to Kingsbury.

History

The historian David Hey describes Conisbrough as appearing to be the most important place in Anglo-Saxon and Viking South Yorkshire.  In a will of around 1003, Conisbrough was bequeathed by Wulfric Spott, founder of Burton Abbey.  At this point, it appears to have been the centre of a major former royal estate, reaching Hatfield Chase.  The manor became royal again under Harold II of England, and by the Norman Conquest, 28 townships in what is now South Yorkshire belonged to the Lord of Conisbrough.  William the Conqueror gave the whole lordship to William de Warenne.

The name of Conisbrough relates to a king's stronghold and this is usually presumed to have either been on the site of Conisbrough Castle, or of the parish church. At the time of the Norman Conquest, the manor of Conisbrough was held by Harold II - he was defeated at the Battle of Hastings. Conisbrough Castle is contained within an artificial oval-shaped enclosure similar to one used as wapentake meeting-places at Gringley on the Hill and East Markham, leading Malcolm Dolby to suppose the castle site may have once been the meeting-place of the Strafforth and Tickhill wapentake.

Conisbrough contains what is believed to be the oldest building in South Yorkshire: the probably 8th-century Anglo-Saxon St Peter's Church.  The church was enlarged in the twelfth century, and David Hey claims that it was a Minster church, forming the centre of a large, early parish covering all or much of the eleventh century Fee of Conisbrough.

Peter Langtoft, writing in the 13th century, claimed that Egbert of Wessex had been received at "Burghe Conane", which is often identified with Conisbrough.

Conisbrough Urban District was the unit of local government between 1921 and 1974, when the area was incorporated into the new Metropolitan Borough of Doncaster.

Kilner connection

In 1863, the Kilner company opened a glass-making plant in Conisbrough. "The bottles made at Conisbrough are chiefly mineral water, spice, confectionery, wine and spirits, pickle, medicine, and chemists. and druggists bottles of all descriptions." In 1866, Caleb Kilner was sent to manage it, along with his cousin Kilner Bateson. In 1937, the Kilner company went bankrupt. Rights to the Kilner Jar product line were sold to the United Glass Bottle Manufacturers in the same year.

Literature

Geoffrey of Monmouth wrote about the town, claiming that it had been fortified by Ambrosius Aurelianus, King of the Britons after his victory over the Anglo-Saxon forces of Hengist, that the captive Anglo-Saxon leader Hengist was hacked to pieces by Eldol outside the town walls, and was buried at "Hengist's Mound" in the town.

In Walter Scott's novel, Ivanhoe, 'Coningsburgh Castle' is based on Conisbrough.  Scott's Coningsburgh is an Anglo-Saxon fortress, based (perhaps knowingly) on the mistaken conclusion that its unique style marked it as a non-Norman castle.  The great tower is described specifically, so that it is clear that Scott has the Norman version of Conisbrough in mind.

Earth Centre
In the mid-1990s, a new tourist attraction, Earth Centre, opened on the nearby site of the former Cadeby Main Colliery. It closed in 2005 after it failed to attract the expected number of visitors. A leisure centre has been built on the site of the former Denaby Main Colliery. In the 2008 drama Survivors, the Earth centre was used as the place Abby was shot and taken in.

Sporting links

It has also been a host to the Olympic torch relay for the 2012 London Olympics.

Yorkshire saw the Grand Départ for the Tour de France in 2014. After this, Yorkshire hosted Le Tour de Yorkshire. In 2016 the tour came through Conisbrough, passing the famous castle on its way to Doncaster.

Notable people

 Cyril Snipe (1888-1944) was a motor racing driver who won the 1912 Targa Florio in Sicily driving an Italian SCAT motor car.
 Tony Christie (born Anthony Fitzgerald, 25 April 1943), a singer most famous for his hit single "(Is This the Way to) Amarillo", was born in the town.

Education

Conisbrough has one secondary school, the De Warenne Academy (formerly Northcliffe School). The Emmanuel Schools Foundation's scheme to turn Northcliffe into an academy was scrapped after protests by parents, students and staff, despite the backing of former Conisbrough councillor Aidan Rave and former Doncaster Mayor Martin Winter.

Primary education in Conisbrough is provided by Ivanhoe Academy, Castle Academy (formerly Station Road School), Morley Place Academy, Rowena Academy and Balby Street Primary.

Further education has been available at the De Warrene Academy from 2010, but some people in the village attend Dearne Valley College, Doncaster College or other colleges further afield.

Amenities
The town lies at the junction of the A6023 and the A630 Doncaster - Rotherham road. To the west is Denaby Main. Pubs in the town include; The Eagle & Child (now closed and for sale), The Red Lion, The Lord Conyers, The Alma, Castle Bar and The Hilltop Hotel. October 2019 saw the opening of the first microbar “The White Lady” selling real ale and other cocktails.  The street formerly known as Butt Hole Road, now Archers Way, is located in Conisbrough.

Shopping
The largest store in Conisbrough is the Sainsburys Local, which serves village residents with products required from an express supermarket. This was formerly the Kwik Save. The land was formerly the petrol station of the Booth family.

Conisbrough had a co-op in the town centre opposite the Sainsburys Store, again used for local conveniences. This closed in September 2016. The site has since been refit and opened as a Go-Local convenience store. The site was originally a cinema.

Shopping facilities include chemists (Town Centre & Doctors), florist shops, card shop, vape / smokers' store, news agents, butchers, do-it-yourself / hardware stores, estate agency / financial advisors, clothes store, bookmakers, cafe, charity shops and house clearance shop.

Other stores include the Crusty Cob Shop, which has the bakery head office and bake house for their small local chain. The last bank in the town was NatWest. It closed in November 2015 leaving no bank. However, there are cash machines available 24/7 at the old bank site, Sainsbury and the post office. The Go-Local has a cash machine outside but only available during store hours. There is now an agency of Yorkshire Building Society situated in Dunstan Estate Agents, this being the only banking facility apart from the post office.

Public transport

Bus services
The main bus operator in the town is Stagecoach Yorkshire, providing an extensive network of services into Doncaster & throughout the Dearne Valley, referred to as "The Dearne Link".  Buses run at least every ten minutes into Doncaster & Mexborough and at least half-hourly through to Barnsley, Wath, Cortonwood & Rotherham. First South Yorkshire also operates a service through Conisbrough, running at least every ten minutes throughout the day between Sheffield and Doncaster on its X78 route

Rail services
The town is served by Conisbrough railway station and the main operator from the railway station is Northern. There are frequent services in both directions from Conisbrough railway station to destinations including Doncaster,  Mexborough, Swinton, Rotherham, Sheffield, Scunthorpe, Worksop, Retford, Gainsborough, Saxilby and Lincoln. Recently, Stagecoach restored bus services past the railway station after an absence of almost ten years. The X20 links Doncaster and Barnsley.

See also
Listed buildings in Conisbrough and Denaby

References

External links

 

 
Towns in South Yorkshire
Unparished areas in South Yorkshire
Geography of the Metropolitan Borough of Doncaster